Michael Wenham Fibbens (born 31 May 1968) is an English former competitive swimmer

Swimming career
He represented Great Britain in three consecutive Summer Olympic Games, the FINA world championships and the European championships, and competed for England in the Commonwealth Games.

He is a four times winner of the British Championship in 50 metres freestyle (1989, 1991, 1993, 1994) and a four times winner in the 100 metres freestyle (1989, 1991-1993). He also won the 50 metres butterfly title in 1991 and 1994  and the 100 metres butterfly title in 1991 and 1993.

See also
 List of Commonwealth Games medallists in swimming (men)

References

External links
 British Olympic Association athlete profile

1968 births
Living people
Commonwealth Games bronze medallists for England
English male freestyle swimmers
Medalists at the FINA World Swimming Championships (25 m)
Olympic swimmers of Great Britain
Sportspeople from Harlow
Swimmers at the 1988 Summer Olympics
Swimmers at the 1990 Commonwealth Games
Swimmers at the 1992 Summer Olympics
Swimmers at the 1996 Summer Olympics
Commonwealth Games medallists in swimming
Doping cases in swimming
English sportspeople in doping cases
People educated at Richard Hale School
Medallists at the 1990 Commonwealth Games